The Woman Who Dared may refer to:

The Woman Who Dared (1916 film), American film directed by George E. Middleton
 The Woman Who Dared (1944 film), French film directed by Jean Grémillon
 The Woman Who Dared (1933 film), American film directed by Millard Webb